The Boganida is a river in Krasnoyarsk Krai in Russia. It is a left tributary of the Kheta (Khatanga basin). The Boganida is formed by the confluence of the Kegerdi and Khopsokkon, which both originate from Lake Labaz.

References

Rivers of Krasnoyarsk Krai